FM or Fm may refer to:

Technology and computing
 Frequency modulation, the carrying of information over an electromagnetic wave by varying its frequency. Its most common applications are:
 FM broadcasting, used primarily to broadcast music and speech at VHF frequencies via radio
 FM broadcast band, frequency band used for FM broadcasting
 .fm, country-code top-level domain (ccTLD) of the Federated States of Micronesia
 FM Towns, one of a line of personal computers by Fujitsu
 Formula Mazda, SCCA Class designation FM
 Nissan FM platform, a "front midships" automobile layout
 Volvo FM, heavy truck range

Science and medicine
 fm, the symbol for femtometre, a unit of length also called a fermi
 fM, the symbol for femtomolar, a unit of molar concentration
 Fermium, a chemical element with symbol Fm
 FM (chemotherapy), a chemotherapy regimen using Fludarabine and Mitoxantrone
 Family medicine, a medical specialty devoted to comprehensive health care for people of all ages
 Fibromyalgia, a chronic syndrome with widespread pain etc.

Film and television
 FM (film), 1978
 FM (TV channel), American TV network
 FM (American TV series), an American sitcom broadcast from 1989–1990
 FM (British TV series), British sitcom broadcast in 2009

Music

Musical artists 
 FM (British band), a British AOR/hard rock band
 FM (Canadian band), a Canadian progressive rock band
 FM Static, a Canadian pop punk duo
 F.M. Einheit (born 1958), German musician and ex-member of Einstürzende Neubauten
 Far East Movement, a hip hop/electropop quartet based in Los Angeles

Other uses in music
 FM (soundtrack), the original soundtrack to the 1978 film FM
 "FM (No Static at All)", a 1978 song by Steely Dan from the soundtrack
 FM Records, a record label
 "FM" (short for "frequent mutilation"), a song by The Slits
 FM (EP), a 2015 extended play by South Korean girl group Crayon Pop
 FM!, a 2018 album by Vince Staples
 F minor, chords and scale
 FM (album), a 2006 album by the Turkish band Replikas

Businesses and organizations 
 FM Global, a mutual insurance company
 FM Records, a record label
 Fannie Mae, a colloquial name for the United States' Federal National Mortgage Association
 Future Movement, a Lebanese political party
 Franklin & Marshall College or F&M, a private liberal arts college in Lancaster, Pennsylvania, U.S.
 Shanghai Airlines (IATA airline designator), an airline headquartered in Shanghai

People 
 F.M. Einheit (born 1958), German musician, ex-member of Einstürzende Neubauten
 FM-2030 (1930–2000), transhumanist philosopher
 Ferdinand Marcos (1917–1989), Filipino politician and former President of the Philippines

Places 
 Federated States of Micronesia (ISO 3166-1 country code, FIPS PUB 10-4 territory code, and postal code)
 Province of Fermo, a province of Italy (ISO 3166-2:IT code)
 Flower Mound, Texas, a city in the Dallas-Fort Worth Metroplex

Titles 
 FIDE Master, a title awarded by the world chess governing body
 Field marshal, the highest rank in the British Army
 First minister, a leader of a government cabinet
 Foreign minister, a cabinet minister in charge of a state's foreign policy and relations

Other uses 
 Facility management, an interdisciplinary field devoted to the co-ordination of all business support services
 Farm-to-market road ("FM", sometimes "F-t-M"), a state or county road connecting rural and agricultural areas to market towns
 F.M. (novel), by Boris Akunin on Fyodor Dostoevsky
 Famous Monsters of Filmland, magazine
 Football Manager, a video game
 United States Army Field Manuals, in U.S. Army parlance
 Fayetteville-Manlius Central School District or F-M, Syracuse, New York, U.S.

See also 
 F&M (disambiguation)
 FMS (disambiguation)